Kendal Museum is a local museum in Kendal, Cumbria, on the edge of the Lake District in northwest England. It was founded in 1796 and includes collections of local archaeology, history, and geology, and a natural history collection from around the globe. The museum also features a changing programme of temporary exhibitions and displays, events, walks, and talks. The museum has a large natural history taxidermy collection, and features a stuffed polar bear and a model of a dodo.

The museum is open three days a week from Thursday to Saturday, with a charge of £5 (adults) and £2 (5-18's) for admission, with Under 5's going free. The opening hours are 9.30am to 4.45pm with last entry at 4pm.

In April 2011, Kendal Museum achieved the Visitor Attraction Quality Assurance Scheme  assessment, awarded by Visit England.

Kendal Museum is managed by Kendal College on behalf of South Lakeland District Council. and is part of the Arts and Media campus at the North End of Kendal.

References

External links
 
 Kendal College

Museums established in 1796
Lake District
Museums in Cumbria
Natural history museums in England
Geology museums in England
Archaeological museums in England
Museums of ancient Rome in the United Kingdom
Local museums in Cumbria
1796 establishments in England
Tourist attractions in Cumbria
Kendal